Martin Glenn Barber (February 2, 1935 – March 28, 2008), was an American country and rockabilly performer. He recorded for Hickory Records in the 1970s, releasing three albums and charting 21 singles on Hot Country Songs. His highest chart entry was "Unexpected Goodbye", which reached number 23.

One of his final brushes with the charts occurred in 1979 with "Everyone Wants to Disco". In discovering that 'they' did not, he changed career and pursued other avenues such as painting and screenwriting.

Glenn Barber died in Gallatin, Tennessee, in March 2008, at the age of 73.

Discography

Albums

Singles

References

External links
CONELRAD | ATOMIC PLATTERS – Atom Bomb: Glenn Barber [Recorded 1955]
[ Glenn Barber] – from Allmusic
GLENN BARBER – THE STORY –

1935 births
2008 deaths
People from Hollis, Oklahoma
Country musicians from Oklahoma
American country rock singers
American country singer-songwriters
American rockabilly musicians
Hickory Records artists
Starday Records artists
20th-century American singers
Singer-songwriters from Oklahoma